Bezbozhnik u Stanka (The Godless at the Workbench) was a monthly and later biweekly antireligious magazine of the Moscow Committee of the AUCP(b).  Published from December 1923 to 1931, it circulated roughly 35 thousand to 70 thousand copies per issue.

The magazine criticized religion from the point of view of Marxism. On its pages the questions of socialist construction, culture, anti-religious propaganda in the USSR were highlighted in a popular form, the connection of religious organizations with the exploiting classes was revealed. Criticism was directed at the Christian, Jewish, Muslim, Buddhist and other religions. The magazine had the following sections: 1) the class essence of religion, 2) religion and the class struggle abroad, 3) eastern religions, 4) in the camp of white emigrants, 5) the significance of religion in the USSR, as brakes on material and spiritual culture, 6) the reactionary role of religions in family life, 7) religion and class struggle under tsarism, 8) religion and revolution, 9) pioneer page, 10) methods of anti-religious propaganda, 11) materialism and idealism (religion), as two class systems of understanding of nature, human and social life, 12) questions and answers, 13) bibliography. The editor-in-chief of the magazine «Bezbozhnik u Stanka» was Maria Kostelovskaya

The first edition of the Great Soviet Encyclopedia reports that the magazine from the moment of its appearance began to penetrate abroad, especially to America, and met with lively interest from the workers; 1924, in the House of Lords, the Archbishop of Canterbury protested against the distribution of the magazine in England, saying that the Bolsheviks "encroached on the highest achievement of human culture" – on religion; from the spring of 1925 the magazine in England was banned.

However, in publications and illustrations of the magazine, often brutal attacks against religion were made, which offended the religious feelings of believers. For this, the magazine has been criticized more than once in the party press and by party organizations.

Examples of issues

See also 

 Bezbozhnik (newspaper)
 Council for Religious Affairs
 Persecutions of the Catholic Church and Pius XII
 Persecution of Christians in the Soviet Union
 Persecution of Muslims in the former USSR
 Religion in the Soviet Union
 State atheism
 USSR anti-religious campaign (1928–1941)

References

Notes

 Atheistic Dictionary / [Абдусамедов А. И., Алейник Р. М., Алиева Б. А. и др. ; под общ. ред. М. П. Новикова]. - 2-е изд., испр. и доп. - Москва : Политиздат, 1985. - 512 с.; 20 см / С. 51
 Siegelbaum, Lewis H. Soviet state and society between revolutions, 1918-1929 / Lewis H. Siegelbaum. - [Repr.]. - Cambridge [etc.] : Cambridge univ. press, 1994. - XIII, 284 с.; 23 см. - (Cambridge soviet paperbacks; 8).;  (paperback)/ p. 161

1926 establishments in the Soviet Union
1931 disestablishments in the Soviet Union
Anti-Christian sentiment in Asia
Anti-Christian sentiment in Europe
Anti-religious campaign in the Soviet Union
Atheism publications
Magazines published in the Soviet Union
Magazines established in 1923
Magazines disestablished in 1931
Magazines published in Moscow
Monthly magazines published in Russia
Persecution of Muslims
Propaganda in the Soviet Union
Propaganda newspapers and magazines
Religious persecution by communists
Russian-language magazines
Anti-Islam sentiment in the Soviet Union